The 2012 Internazionali Femminili di Palermo was a professional women's tennis tournament played on outdoor clay courts. It was the 25th edition of the tournament which was part of the 2012 WTA Tour. It took place in Palermo, Italy between 9 and 15 July 2012. Sara Errani won the singles title.

Singles main draw entrants

Seeds

 1 Rankings are as of June 25, 2012

Other entrants
The following players received wildcards into the singles main draw:
  Nastassja Burnett
  Maria Elena Camerin
  Anastasia Grymalska

The following players received entry from the qualifying draw:
  Estrella Cabeza Candela
  Dia Evtimova
  Katalin Marosi
  Valentyna Ivakhnenko

The following players received entry as lucky loser:
  Sacha Jones

Withdrawals
  Kaia Kanepi (heels)
  Michaëlla Krajicek
  Alexandra Panova
  Shahar Peer
  Agnieszka Radwańska (upper respiratory illness)
  Francesca Schiavone (bronchitis)
  Galina Voskoboeva
  Klára Zakopalová

Retirements
  Katalin Marosi 
  Anna Tatishvili

Doubles main draw entrants

Seeds

1 Rankings are as of June 25, 2012

Other entrants
The following pairs received wildcards into the doubles main draw:
  Nastassja Burnett /  Anastasia Grymalska
  Claudia Giovine /  Mădălina Gojnea

Retirements
  Anna Tatishvili (right thigh strain)

Champions

Singles

 Sara Errani def.  Barbora Záhlavová-Strýcová, 6–1, 6–3

Doubles

 Renata Voráčová /  Barbora Záhlavová-Strýcová def.  Darija Jurak /  Katalin Marosi, 7–6(7–5), 6–4

References

External links
Official Website

Internazionali Femminili di Palermo
Internazionali Femminili di Palermo
2012 in Italian women's sport
Torneo